Jackson Hastings (born 4 January 1996) is a Great Britain international rugby league footballer who plays as a  and  for the Newcastle Knights in the NRL.

He previously played for the Manly Warringah Sea Eagles, Sydney Roosters and the Wests Tigers in the National Rugby League, and the Salford Red Devils and the Wigan Warriors in the Super League.

On 6 October 2019, he was crowned Man of Steel.

Background
Hastings was born in Wollongong, New South Wales, Australia, and is of British descent through his grandmother.

He played his junior football for the Western Suburbs Red Devils before being signed by the St. George Illawarra Dragons.

Playing career

Early career
In 2012 and 2013, Hastings played for the New South Wales Under 16s and Under 18s teams respectively.

In 2013, Hastings played for the St. George Illawarra Dragons' NYC team, and was selected for the Australian Schoolboys.

Hastings played 47 games, scored 14 tries, kicked 195 goals and 1 field goal for 447 points in his U20s career from 2013 to 2016 with both the St. George Illawarra Dragons and the Sydney Roosters.

Sydney Roosters
On 27 August 2013, Hastings signed with the Sydney Roosters on a 3-year contract, rejecting offers from St. George Illawarra, North Queensland Cowboys and Newcastle Knights. He played for the Roosters' NYC team in 2014.

In Round 26 of the 2014 NRL season, Hastings made his NRL debut for the Sydney Roosters against the South Sydney Rabbitohs.

On 2 May 2015, Hastings played for the Junior Kangaroos against Junior Kiwis. 
On 8 July 2015, Hastings played for the New South Wales Under-20s team against the Queensland Under-20s team.

Manly-Warringah Sea Eagles
In December 2016, Hastings signed a 2-year contract with the Manly Warringah Sea Eagles starting in 2017.
Hastings made his Debut for the  Manly Warringah Sea Eagles  in Round 3 of the 2017 NRL season   against the  North Queensland Cowboys coming off the bench and filling  in at Fullback and Scoring a try as the Manly Warringah Sea Eagles defeated  the North Queensland Cowboys  30-8.

At the start of the 2018 season, Hastings was involved in a well publicised falling out with fellow Manly player Daly Cherry-Evans and coach Trent Barrett.  He was banished to reserve grade to play for Blacktown Workers and told he would be moved on by the club.

On 26 June 2018, Hastings was released from the remainder of his contract with Manly.  The club released a statement saying "Manly Warringah Sea Eagles have today released Jackson Hastings from the remainder of his contract, effective immediately, The Club and Jackson’s management have made the decision mutually".

Salford Red Devils
On 12 July 2018, Hastings signed a two year deal to join British side the Salford Red Devils.

On 8 July 2019, Hastings was announced to have signed a 2-year deal with Super League side Wigan, effective from the start of the 2020 season.

On 6 October 2019, Hastings won the Man of Steel award after being voted as the Super League's best player during the Super League XXIV season.
Hastings was part of the Salford side which reached the 2019 Super League Grand Final but were defeated 23-6 by St Helens at Old Trafford.  Salford were looking to win their first championship since 1976.

Wigan Warriors
Hastings joined Wigan ahead of the 2020 Super League season.

Hastings played in the 2020 Super League Grand Final which Wigan lost 8-4 against St Helens.

On April 19, 2021, Hastings signed a two-year deal to join NRL side the Wests Tigers starting in 2022.

In round 7 of the 2021 Super League season against Salford, Hastings kicked a field goal to win the match for Wigan 17-16.

Wests Tigers
Wests Tigers signed Hastings on a two-year deal worth about $500,000 a season with a possible upgrade next year. In round 1 of the 2022 NRL season, Hastings made his club debut for the Wests Tigers in their 26-16 loss against Melbourne.

In round 6, Hastings helped the Wests Tigers to their first win of the 2022 season, kicking a 38 metre field goal to break a 20-all deadlock against Parramatta with seconds left remaining in the match.
On 31 July 2022, Hastings was ruled out for the remainder of the 2022 NRL season after suffering a broken ankle in Wests Tigers upset victory over Brisbane.Despite his 16 appearances, he was still second in the NRL in the "line engaged" stat.
The Wests Tigers club would finish the 2022 NRL season on the bottom of the table and claim the Wooden Spoon for the first time.

Newcastle Knights
In November 2022, Hastings was released from the final year of his Wests Tigers contract and signed a three-year deal with the Newcastle Knights.

In round 1 of the 2023 NRL season, Hastings made his club debut for Newcastle in their 20-12 loss against the New Zealand Warriors.

Representative career
He was selected in squad for the 2019 Great Britain Lions tour of the Southern Hemisphere. He made his Great Britain test début in the defeat by Tonga.

On 25 June 2021 he played for the Combined Nations All Stars in their 26-24 victory over England, staged at the Halliwell Jones Stadium, Warrington, as part of England’s 2021 Rugby League World Cup preparation.

Personal life
Hastings is the son of Megan Harrod and former Sydney Roosters player Kevin Hastings.

References

External links

Newcastle Knights profile
Wests Tigers profile
Salford Red Devils profile
SL profile
Manly Sea Eagles profile
Sydney Roosters profile

1996 births
Living people
Australian people of English descent
Australian rugby league players
Australian expatriate sportspeople in England
Combined Nationalities rugby league team captains
Combined Nationalities rugby league team players
Manly Warringah Sea Eagles players
Newtown Jets NSW Cup players
Rugby league five-eighths
Rugby league halfbacks
Rugby league players from Wollongong
Salford Red Devils players
Sydney Roosters players
Wigan Warriors players
Wests Tigers players
Newcastle Knights players
Great Britain national rugby league team players